A wage is the distribution from an employer of a security paid to an employee.

Wage may also refer to:

Places
Wage Rural LLG, Enga Province, Papua New Guinea
Lower Wage Rural LLG, Hela Province, Papua New Guinea
Upper Wage Rural LLG, Hela Province, Papua New Guinea

Radio stations in the United States
 WAGE (FM) (91.1 FM), a defunct station in Dogwood Lakes Estate, Florida
 WAGE-LP (106.5 FM), a low-power station in Oak Hill, West Virginia
 WTSD (AM) (1190 AM), originally WAGE, in Leesburg, Virginia
 WHEN (AM) (620 AM), originally WAGE, in Syracuse, New York

Other uses
 Wage Rudolf Supratman (1903–1938), Indonesian songwriter 
 Wide Area GPS Enhancement
 Wage (film), a 2017 Indonesian film directed by John de Rantau